The 2008 Illinois Fighting Illini football team represented the University of Illinois in the 2008 NCAA Division I FBS football season. The team's head coach was Ron Zook. The Illini played their home games at Memorial Stadium in Champaign, Illinois. This was Zook's fourth season as the Illini head coach.

Schedule

Game summaries

Missouri

Eastern Illinois

Louisiana-Lafayette

In the first quarter, Matt Eller kicked a 51-yard field goal. Brit Miller recovered Michael Desormeaux's fumble for a 27-yard touchdown. Drew Edmiston kicked a 24-yard field goal for Louisiana-Lafayette.
Juice Williams passed to Daniel Dufrene for a 10-yard touchdown in the 2nd quarter.

In the second half, Desormeaux rushed for a 34-yard touchdown and passed to Erick Jones for an 11-yard touchdown. Matt Eller kicked a 27-yard field goal for the Fighting Illini.

Penn State
The Illini lost on the road to the Nittany Lions 38–24 in a nationally-televised, prime time, "White Out" game at Beaver Stadium. Illinois jumped out to a 14–7 lead, becoming the first team to take a lead on the Nittany Lions and the first to score points against them in the first quarter this season. However, the Nittany Lions responded with two touchdowns en route to a 21–14 halftime lead. The Illini wouldn't score again until kicking a field goal on the final play of the third quarter after recovering a Stephfon Green fumble, but Derrick Williams returned the ensuing kickoff for a touchdown.

The loss was head coach Ron Zook’s first as a head coach against a ranked opponent. The Illini's 24 points were the most allowed by Penn State this season as were their 189 total rushing yards.

Penn State wide receiver Derrick Williams became the first player under PSU head coach Joe Paterno to score a rushing, a receiving, and a kick return touchdown in the same game. Williams was selected the Big Ten Special Teams Player of the Week.

Michigan

Minnesota

Indiana

Wisconsin

The Fighting Illini fell to the Badgers 27–17 for Wisconsin's first Big Ten win of the year. The Badgers outscored Illinois 17–7 in the second half.

Iowa

Western Michigan

Ohio State

Northwestern

Rankings

References

Illinois
Illinois Fighting Illini football seasons
Illinois Fighting Illini football